Dumbarton was a royal burgh that returned one commissioner to the Parliament of Scotland and to the Convention of Estates.

After the Acts of Union 1707, Dumbarton, Glasgow, Renfrew and Rutherglen formed the Glasgow district of burghs, returning one member between them to the House of Commons of Great Britain.

List of burgh commissioners

 1661–63, 1669-1670: Walter Watson, provost 
1665 convention:no representation
 1667 convention: Robert Cuningham 
 1672–73, 1678 (convention): Robert Watson, provost 
 1681–82: William MacFarlane, provost 
 1685–86, 1689 convention, 1689–1702, 1702–07: James Smollett of Bonhill, provost

References

See also
 List of constituencies in the Parliament of Scotland at the time of the Union

Constituencies of the Parliament of Scotland (to 1707)
History of West Dunbartonshire
Politics of West Dunbartonshire
Constituencies disestablished in 1707
1707 disestablishments in Scotland
Dumbarton